The 2015 Keio Challenger is a professional tennis tournament played on hard courts. It is the eleventh edition of the tournament which is part of the 2015 ATP Challenger Tour. It takes place in Yokohama, Japan between November 16 and November 22, 2015.

Singles main-draw entrants

Seeds

 1 Rankings are as of November 9, 2015.

Other entrants
The following players received wildcards into the singles main draw:
  Sora Fukuda
  Makoto Ochi
  Masato Shiga
  Kaito Uesugi

The following players received entry from the qualifying draw:
  Yusuke Watanuki
  Kento Takeuchi
  Yuya Kibi
  Peter Kobelt

Champions

Singles

 Taro Daniel def.  Go Soeda 4–6, 6–3, 6–3

Doubles

 Sanchai Ratiwatana /  Sonchat Ratiwatana def.  Riccardo Ghedin /  Yi Chu-huan 6–4, 6–4

External links
Official Website

 
Keio Challenger
Keio Challenger
2015 in Japanese tennis
November 2015 sports events in Japan